Bianca Williams (born 18 December 1993) is a British athlete. She competed for England at the 2014 Commonwealth Games, where she won bronze medals in the 200 m, and in the 4 × 100 m relay. She has also won two medals as part of the British team at the IAAF World Relays; with silver in the 4 × 200 m in 2014, and bronze in the 4 × 100 m in 2015. She ranks fifth on the UK all-time list at 200m with her best of 22.58 secs.

Personal life 
Williams is in a relationship with the Portuguese sprinter Ricardo dos Santos with whom she has a son, born in 2020.

2020 police incident 
On 4 July 2020, Williams and dos Santos accused the Metropolitan Police of racial profiling after having their car stopped and searched whilst returning from a training session. Williams uploaded a video of them both being detained and searched. After the incident occurred, Linford Christie shared Williams' video of the incident on Twitter, with the comment "Racist police aren't just in America #BLM". Williams subsequently spoke with The Times and accused the police of racial profiling and acting violently towards her family. Keir Starmer said on LBC that senior Met officers should feel “very uncomfortable” about the force's handling of the case.

The Met released a statement, saying the vehicle Williams was travelling in had been on the wrong side of the road, and that the driver had sped off when asked to stop. They also said the Directorate of Professional Standards had reviewed footage from social media and officers' bodycams, and were satisfied there was no concern around the officers' conduct involved in the incident. On 7 July 2020, the Met voluntarily referred the incident to the Independent Office for Police Conduct, for independent investigation into the incident. Additionally, they stated how they are now treating the matter as a 'public complaint'.

On 1 July 2021, it was announced that three of the six officers involved were under investigation for gross misconduct. In January 2023, it was reported that five officers are to face a gross misconduct hearing, and that an investigator at the IOPC resigned in November 2020, complaining that her investigation of the incident had been "watered down".

Personal bests

References

External links
 
 
 
 
 
 
 

1993 births
Living people
Athletes from London
English female sprinters
English sportspeople of Jamaican descent
Commonwealth Games bronze medallists for England
Commonwealth Games medallists in athletics
Athletes (track and field) at the 2014 Commonwealth Games
Athletes (track and field) at the 2018 Commonwealth Games
Athletes (track and field) at the 2022 Commonwealth Games
World Athletics Championships athletes for Great Britain
European Athletics Championships medalists
Alumni of the University of East London
Medallists at the 2014 Commonwealth Games
Medallists at the 2018 Commonwealth Games
Medallists at the 2022 Commonwealth Games